Feud of the Trail is a 1937 American Western film starring Tom Tyler.

It is the fourth in a series of Westerns Tyler made for Sam Katzman's Victory Productions. Tyler has a dual role, playing the hero and a villainous look-alike. It was shot at the Lazy A Ranch at Chatsworth, California.

References

External links
Feud of the Trail at IMDb
Complete movie at YouTube

Films shot in California
1937 films
1937 Western (genre) films
American black-and-white films
American Western (genre) films
Films directed by Robert F. Hill
1930s American films